The 1877 Dungarvan by-election was fought on 23 June 1877.  The byelection was fought due to the death of the incumbent Home Rule MP, John O'Keeffe.  It was won by the Home Rule candidate Frank Hugh O'Donnell.

References

Dungarvan
1877 elections in the United Kingdom
By-elections to the Parliament of the United Kingdom in County Waterford constituencies
1877 elections in Ireland